Deurne is a railway station in Deurne, Netherlands.  The station opened on 1 November 1864 and is on the Venlo–Eindhoven railway. The station has 3 platforms, 1 where the stoptrein from Eindhoven terminates.

Train services
The following services call at Deurne:
2x per hour intercity services to Eindhoven, 's Hertogenbosch, Utrecht, Amsterdam and Schiphol Airport
2x per hour intercity services to Horst-Sevenum, Blerick and Venlo
2x per hour local services (stoptrein) Deurne, Helmond, Eindhoven, Boxtel, 's Hertogenbosch

Bus services

External links
NS website 
Dutch Public Transport journey planner 

Railway stations in North Brabant
Railway stations opened in 1864
Railway stations on the Staatslijn E
Deurne, Netherlands